This is a season-by-season list of records compiled by Minnesota State in men's ice hockey.

Minnesota State has made several appearances in the NCAA Tournament and won 1980 Division II National Championship.

Season-by-season results

Note: GP = Games played, W = Wins, L = Losses, T = Ties

* Winning percentage is used when conference schedules are unbalanced.

Footnotes

References

 
Minnesota State
Minnesota State Mavericks ice hockey seasons